The Conference League Cup (formerly known as the Setanta Shield for sponsorship reasons, and before that the Bob Lord Challenge Trophy) was a football competition open to clubs playing in the Football Conference.

History
The competition was formed for the inaugural season of what was then called the Alliance Premier League, in 1979–80 and existed for twenty-two seasons before being axed at the end of the 2000–01 season.  It was briefly reformed for the 2004–05 season, in the form of the Conference Challenge Cup, but following a poor response it was again agreed not to renew the competition for the next season. 

With the transfer of sponsorship of the Conference to Blue Square for the start of the 2007–08 season two seasons later, the re-introduction of the competition was announced, scheduled to commence that year. On 23 June 2009 the Conference League Cup's sponsor, Setanta's GB division went into administration and ceased broadcasting. The tournament has not been held since 2009.

Format

The competition was a knockout tournament with pairings drawn at random – like the FA Cup there is a minimal form of seeding, in that members of the (higher-level) Conference National enter together at a later stage in the tournament, and the draw for each round took place after the completion of the round before.

Winners

Source: (note: source does not list finals for 1986–87 to 1988–89)

References

External links
Setanta Shield results 2007-08 on BBC Sport
Setanta Shield results 2008-09 on BBC Sport

 
+League Cup
Defunct football cup competitions in England